The 22nd Legislative Assembly of Ontario was in session from June 4, 1945, until April 27, 1948, just prior to the 1948 general election. The majority party was the Ontario Progressive Conservative Party led by George Drew.

William James Stewart served as speaker for the assembly until March 21, 1947. James de Congalton Hepburn succeeded Stewart as speaker.

Members elected to the Assembly

Timeline

External links 
Members in Parliament 22

References 

Terms of the Legislative Assembly of Ontario
1945 establishments in Ontario
1948 disestablishments in Ontario